The 32nd Arizona State Legislature, consisting of the Arizona State Senate and the Arizona House of Representatives, was constituted in Phoenix from January 1, 1975, to December 31, 1976, during the first two years of Raúl Héctor Castro's single term as Governor of Arizona. Both the Senate and the House membership remained constant at 30 and 60, respectively. The Democrats reversed the margin of control in the upper house, gaining an 18–12 edge in the senate, while they also made inroads in the Republican's majority in the house, although the Republicans still controlled the lower body with a 33–27 margin.

Sessions
The Legislature met for two regular sessions at the State Capitol in Phoenix. The first opened on January 13, 1975, and adjourned on June 13; while the second convened on January 12, 1976, and adjourned on June 24. There was a single Special Session, convened on January 12, 1976, and adjourned on March 1, 1976.

State Senate

Members

The asterisk (*) denotes members of the previous Legislature who continued in office as members of this Legislature.

House of Representatives

Members 
The asterisk (*) denotes members of the previous Legislature who continued in office as members of this Legislature.

References

Arizona legislative sessions
1975 in Arizona
1976 in Arizona
1975 U.S. legislative sessions
1976 U.S. legislative sessions